Full measure or Full Measure may refer to:

"Full Measure" (Breaking Bad), a 2010 episode of Breaking Bad
Full measure (mathematics), a set whose complement is of measure zero
Full Measure (TV series), a 2015 series hosted by Sharyl Attkisson
Full Measure, a 1929 novel by Hans Otto Storm
"Full Measure", a 1966 song by The Lovin' Spoonful from Hums of the Lovin' Spoonful
Full Measure, a 2014 novel by T. Jefferson Parker

See also
 The Last Full Measure (disambiguation)